Tommi Siirilä  (born 5 August 1993) is a Finnish male volleyball player. He was part of the Finland men's national volleyball team at the 2014 FIVB Volleyball Men's World Championship in Poland. He played for Sir Conad Perugia.

References

1993 births
Living people
Finnish men's volleyball players
Place of birth missing (living people)
Finnish expatriates in France
Expatriate volleyball players in France